Józef Lewicki (15 March 1934 – 29 October 2021) was a Polish swimmer. He competed in the men's 4 × 200 metre freestyle relay at the 1952 Summer Olympics.

References

External links
 

1934 births
2021 deaths
Olympic swimmers of Poland
Swimmers at the 1952 Summer Olympics
Sportspeople from Lviv
People from Lwów Voivodeship
Polish male freestyle swimmers